José María Aricó (1931 in Villa María, Córdoba Province, Argentina – 22 August 1991) was an Argentine intellectual.

Influenced by Antonio Gramsci, he developed a democratic Socialist thought.

Works
 Marx and Latin America (English translation of Marx y América Latina). Leiden & Boston, Brill (2014)
 Mariátegui y los orígenes del marxismo latinoamericano
 Marx y América Latina
 La cola del diablo. Itinerario de Gramsci en América Latina
 La hipótesis de Justo: escritos sobre el socialismo en América Latina
 Entrevistas, 1974-1991

References

External links
 Biblioteca José María Aricó - UNC.
 Club de Cultura Socialista José Aricó.
 Pancho Aricó - Interview to Beatriz Sarlo on life and thought of Aricó.
 Aricó, pensador de fronteras.
 

1931 births
1991 deaths
People from Villa María
Argentine socialists
Argentine sociologists
Argentine male writers
South American democratic socialists